The Thomas Jefferis House is a historic building located in Council Bluffs, Iowa, United States.  Jefferis was a Delaware native who was a homeopathic physician.  He made and lost fortunes through his involvement in speculative ventures, including real estate and a silver mine in Utah.  The two-story frame Italianate structure was completed in 1869.  It features bracketed eaves, cornice, full length front porch, and siding that is scored to resemble ashlar.  It was originally capped with a belvedere, which has been lost.  The house is composed of three blocks.  It was converted into a funeral home in the 1940s, and it housed other businesses since.  The building was listed on the National Register of Historic Places in 1979.

References

Houses completed in 1869
Houses in Council Bluffs, Iowa
National Register of Historic Places in Pottawattamie County, Iowa
Houses on the National Register of Historic Places in Iowa
Italianate architecture in Iowa